Jakub Diviš (born 27 July 1986 in Turnov) is a Czech footballer who plays as a goalkeeper for SK Benešov.

He has previously played for Slavia Prague, Slavoj Vyšehrad, Sparta Krč, Tatran Prešov, Scottish club Hibernian and Mladá Boleslav.

Career

Early career
Diviš began his senior career with Slavia Prague. He played his first full game in a UEFA Cup match against AFC Ajax on 17 December 2008. He played from January to June 2008 on loan at Sparta Krč, where he scored a last-minute goal in a league match against Ústí nad Labem, which finished 2–2.

Tatran Prešov
In June 2009, Diviš was loaned out to Slovak side Tatran Prešov. At Tatran he quickly became a first-choice goalkeeper and in early 2010 signed a permanent deal with the club.

Hibernian (loan)
In January 2011, Diviš was loaned to Scottish club Hibernian on a 12-month deal, making his debut in a 2–1 defeat against St Johnstone on 30 April 2011. Diviš returned to Tatran Presov in June 2011 after Hibs declined an option to extend his loan.

CSKA Sofia
On 12 July 2014, Diviš signed with CSKA Sofia on a two-year deal. He made his competitive debut five days later, in a 1–1 home draw against Zimbru Chișinău in the second qualifying round of the 2014–15 Europa League. In the first two league games of the 2014–15 season he recorded two clean sheets against Litex Lovech (1–0) and Levski Sofia (2–0). Diviš conceded his first goals for CSKA in the Bulgarian A Group in a 2–2 draw with Slavia Sofia on 3 August. He remained the first choice goalkeeper until the resignation of Stoycho Mladenov in late March 2015, being soon after that relegated to the bench by Maksims Uvarenko and Anatoli Gospodinov.

International
Diviš played three times for the Czech Republic national under-21 football team, including one against Scotland U21 at the Falkirk Stadium.

References

External links
Slavia Profile

1986 births
Living people
Czech footballers
Czech Republic youth international footballers
Czech Republic under-21 international footballers
Hibernian F.C. players
SK Slavia Prague players
1. FC Tatran Prešov players
FK Mladá Boleslav players
PFC CSKA Sofia players
Association football goalkeepers
Czech expatriate footballers
Expatriate footballers in Slovakia
Expatriate footballers in Scotland
Expatriate footballers in Bulgaria
Slovak Super Liga players
Scottish Premier League players
First Professional Football League (Bulgaria) players
Czech expatriate sportspeople in Bulgaria
Czech expatriate sportspeople in Slovakia
Czech expatriate sportspeople in Scotland
SK Sparta Krč players
People from Turnov
Sportspeople from the Liberec Region